The 1788–89 United States presidential election in Delaware took place between December 15, 1788, and January 10, 1789, as part of the 1788–1789 United States presidential election to elect the first President. Voters chose three representatives, or electors to the Electoral College, who voted for President and Vice President.

Delaware unanimously voted for independent candidate and commander-in-chief of the Continental Army, George Washington. The total vote is composed of 685 for Federalist electors, all of whom were supportive of Washington.

Results

See also
 United States presidential elections in Delaware

References

Delaware
1789
1789 Delaware elections